The steam locomotivess with operating numbers 1–8 and 21 belonged to the Palatinate Ludwig Railway. They were the first locomotives built for this company. The locomotives manufactured from 1846 onwards were taken out of service by 1883.

History 
In 1846 and 1847, the Palatinate Ludwig Railway Company procured two locomotives each from the Maschinenfabrik Emil Keßler in Esslingen. In 1847 four identical locomotives (HUMMEL, RHEIN, LAUTER, QUEICH) were acquired from Maffei. In 1851 the ninth locomotive KÖNIG LUDWIG followed, again delivered by Keßler, with works number 200. This was given the operating number 21. The first four locomotives delivered were decommissioned in 1879. The KÖNIG LUDWIG was in service until 1883.

Design features 
The locomotives had an internal forked bed.

Locomotives 1 to 8 had a Long Boiler without a steam dome and were fitted with an overhanging vertical boiler. The vertical boiler had a four-sided dome. On the boiler sat two spring valves (Federwaagventile). Engine no. 21 had a Kessler patent boiler (pear-shaped boiler). The slightly raised vertical boiler had a small steam dome. However, the patent boiler was later replaced by a boiler of standard construction. The long boiler was covered with wood. The boiler feed pumps were driven by return cranks.

The locomotives from Keßler and Maffei differed mainly in the arrangement and control of the regulator. In locomotives supplied by Keßler, the regulator was located in the smokebox and controlled by an external pull from the driver's cab. On Maffei locomotives, the control lever was in the right-hand wall of the vertical boiler's dome.

On delivery, the three wheel sets were centrally located under the boiler. This led to rocking movements. For this reason, the rear axle was moved 12.7 cm to the rear and the overall wheelbase increased. The running wheels were cushioned by leaf spring packs on the running plate.

The external twin cylinder wet steam running gear was arranged horizontally and had an internal Stephenson valve gear.

The screw brake was on the tender and acted on tender wheels. The driver's cab consisted of a windshield that was extended upwards and to the side. The buffers were made of wood. On delivery, the sand box was in front of the driving wheels under the boiler. At the end of the 1860s it was moved to the boiler.

The locomotives had a tall sheet metal chimney. When the boiler was replaced, the  goblet-shaped chimney of locomotive No. 21 was replaced by one of contemporary design.

References

Literature 
 Mühl, Albert (1982). Die Pfalzbahn: Geschichte, Betrieb und Fahrzeuge der pfälzischen Eisenbahnen. Theiss. 252 pp.
 

2-2-2 locomotives
1–8, 21
Railway locomotives introduced in 1846
Maffei locomotives
Standard gauge locomotives of Germany
Passenger locomotives
Esslingen locomotives